The Omulyovka is a river in Magadan Oblast and Sakha Republic, Russia. It is a left tributary of the Yasachnaya.

See also
List of rivers of Russia

References

Rivers of Magadan Oblast
Rivers of the Sakha Republic